Golden Dawn is a 1930 American pre-Code musical operetta film released by Warner Bros., photographed entirely in Technicolor, and starring Vivienne Segal, Walter Woolf King and Noah Beery. The film is based on the semi-hit 1927 stage musical of the same name (music composed by Emmerich Kálmán and Herbert Stothart, book and lyrics by Oscar Hammerstein II and Otto Harbach.)

Plot
The story takes place in colonial Africa, where Dawn is a white girl, kidnapped in infancy and is being brought up by a black native, Mooda, who runs a canteen in the now German colonial settlement. Dawn falls in love with a British rubber planter, Tom Allen, who is now a prisoner of war. The native black leader of the tribes in that region is also in love with Dawn and becomes extremely jealous when he hears of Dawn's love for Allen, who, in turn, is sent back to Britain by the Germans for attempting to steal Dawn, whom they believe is half black.

Eventually, the British regain control of the territory and drive out the Germans. Allen returns to the colony. When the settlement experiences a drought, the local tribal leader attempts to incite the natives against Dawn, claiming God is angry because Dawn has dared to love a white man. Allen is unable to save Dawn because the colonial authorities refuse to act unless they have proof that Dawn is one hundred percent white. Eventually Dawn's "mother" (Mooda) confesses that she is not Dawn's true mother and that Dawn's real mother was white which Dawn's father confirms.

Allen quickly brings British troops just as the natives are about to sacrifice Dawn. During the ceremony however, one of the virgin priestesses reveals that the jealous tribal leader has been lying about Dawn and that God is not interested in Dawn as she is pure white. Furthermore she reveals that the tribal leader had violated her (the priestess's) chastity and claims the true reason for God's anger was this sacrilegious act. The tribal leader is deposed and sacrificed to the anger of the natives and the drought quickly ends as rain pours down. In the end, Dawn and Allen, happily reunited, sail back to England together.

Cast
Walter Woolf King as Tom Allen
Vivienne Segal as Dawn
Noah Beery as Shep Keyes
Alice Gentle as Mooda
Dick Henderson as Duke
Lupino Lane as Mr Pigeon
Marion Byron as Joanna
Edward Martindel as Colonel Judson
Nina Quartero as Dawn's Maid-In-Waiting
Sōjin Kamiyama as Piper
Otto Matieson as Captain Eric
Julanne Johnston as Sister Hedwig

Songs
 "Africa Smiles No More" (Sung by Alice Gentle)
 "The Whip" (Sung by Noah Beery twice)
 "My Bwanna" (Sung by Vivienne Segal and chorus; Reprised by Vivienne Segal)
 "We Two" (Sung by Marion Byron and Dick Henderson)
 "Dawn" (Sung by Walter Woolf King; Reprised by a chorus during finale)
 "Mooda's Song" (Sung by Alice Gentle)
 "My Heart's Love Call" (Sung by Walter Woolf King)
 "It's a Long Way to Tipperary" (Sung by the British exchange prisoners)
 "In a Jungle Bungalow" (Sung by Lupino Lane and chorus; Danced to by Lupino Lane)
 "A Tiger" (Sung and danced to by Marion Byron and Lee Moran; Reprised by Marion Byron)
 "Mulungu Thabu" (Sung by chorus with spoken interjections by Nigel de Brulier)
 "Dawn" (Reprised by chorus)

Production
Beery was the accomplished older brother of actor Wallace Beery and comedian Lupino Lane was the uncle of actress/director Ida Lupino. Noah Beery was widely praised for his deep bass voice after he first sang in Song of the Flame. Beery in blackface singing to his whip (“Listen little whip / while you’re in my grip …”) — recorded the song "The Whip" for Brunswick Records and the recording was issued in their popular ten inch series on record number 4824.

Preservation status
The film survives in a black-and-white copy made in the 1950s by Associated Artists Productions. It is available on DVD from the Warner Archive Collection. One short fragment of an original color print was identified in the British Film Institute archives in 2014.

See also
 List of early color feature films

References
Notes

Bibliography
 Barrios, Richard, A Song in the Dark (Oxford University Press, 1995)

External links 
 

1930 films
1930s color films
Warner Bros. films
American films based on plays
1930s English-language films
Films directed by Ray Enright
Films set in Africa
1930 musical films
Operetta films
American musical films
Early color films
1930s American films